The 2017–18 season was Southend United's 112th year in existence and their third consecutive season in League One. Along with competing in League One, the club also participated in the FA Cup, EFL Cup and EFL Trophy. The season covers the period from 1 July 2017 to 30 June 2018.

Competitions

Friendlies
As of 2 June 2017, Southend United had announced five pre-season friendlies against Braintree Town, Bishop's Stortford, Ebbsfleet United, Brighton & Hove Albion and Cambridge United.

League One

League table

Result summary

Results by matchday

Matches

FA Cup

On 16 October 2017, Southend United were drawn away to Yeovil Town in the first round.

EFL Cup

On 16 June 2017, Southend United were drawn at home to Newport County in the first round.

EFL Trophy
On 12 July 2017, Southend United were drawn in the Southern Group B against Colchester United, Gillingham and Reading U23s. After finishing as runners-up in their group, Southend were drawn away to Peterborough United in the second round.

Squad statistics

Appearances and goals

|-
|}

Transfers

Transfers in

Transfers out

References

Southend United
Southend United F.C. seasons